This is a list of airlines which have an Air Operator Certificate issued by the Civil Aviation Authority  of Chile.

</onlyinclude>
</onlyinclude>
</onlyinclude>
</onlyinclude>

References

See also 
List of airlines
List of defunct airlines of Chile

 
Airlines
Chile
Airlines
Chile